Wheelchair Romeo is a 2022 Indian Kannada language comedy film directed by G Nataraj. The film is produced by T Venkatachalaiah.

The film starring Ram Chethan, Mayuri Kyatari, Rangayana Raghu, Suchendra Prasad, Girish Shivanna and Tabla Nani are in the main role. Santhosh Pandit is the film cinematographer and music is composed by Bharath B. J.. The film was released on 27 May 2022.

Cast 
 Ram Chethan as Ullas
 Mayuri Kyatari as Dimple
 Rangayana Raghu as Jack mama
 Suchendra Prasad as Prasad
 Girish Shivanna as Giri
 Tabla Nani as Autoshankar

References

External links 
 

2022 films
Indian comedy films
2022 comedy films
2020s Kannada-language films